Adventure! is a role-playing game designed and published by Tori Bergquist in 1985.

Description
Adventure! is a universal system.

Publication history
Adventure! was designed and published by Tori Bergquist in 1985 as a 48-page book.

Reception

References

Role-playing games introduced in 1985
Universal role-playing games